Donut Dollies may refer to:

Women who volunteered in the American Red Cross Clubmobile Service during World War II
Women who volunteered in the ARC Supplemental Recreation Overseas Program during the Vietnam war